Where the Wild Things Are: Motion Picture Soundtrack: Original Songs by Karen O and the Kids is the soundtrack to the 2009 film Where the Wild Things Are. It is performed by Karen O and the Kids. It was released on September 29, 2009, in CD, LP, and digital download formats.

Background
Karen O, the vocalist of the indie rock band Yeah Yeah Yeahs, wrote the film's soundtrack. Her bandmates Brian Chase and Nick Zinner and former touring guitarist Imaad Wasif, Deerhunter's Bradford Cox, Liars' Aaron Hemphill, The Dead Weather's Dean Fertita, and Jack Lawrence from The Raconteurs all also contributed.

When director Spike Jonze approached Karen O to write the soundtrack to Where the Wild Things Are, he cited The Langley Schools Music Project's Innocence & Despair as an example of the desired "simple melodies that were emotionally complex—something that both kids and adults would appreciate".

"All Is Love" was released as the soundtrack's lead single on August 25, 2009, and is featured in the credits of the film.

Reception

The soundtrack received generally favorable reviews from music critics. At Metacritic, which assigns a normalized rating out of 100 to reviews from mainstream publications, the soundtrack received an average score of 77, based on 16 reviews.

Track listing

Personnel

 Karen O – vocals (1–9 11–14), guitar (1, 2), production (1–9, 11–14)
 Dean Fertita – keyboards (2, 12, 14), organ (3–5), marimba (4, 6), piano (11, 12), guitar, (3, 13), backing vocals (11)
 Bradford Cox – guitar (2, 3, 5, 8, 9, 11, 12, 14), backing vocals (2, 11), vocal effects (3, 9), glockenspiel (1), ambient sounds (3), bells (4, 7, 13), vibraphone (5)
 Tom Biller – organ (1, 5–7, 9, 13), guitar (2, 11, 12, 14), percussion (2, 12, 14), bass (5, 12), drums (3), church bells (3), backing vocals (11), banjo (12), mixing (1–9, 11–14), production (1–9, 11–14), recording (1–9, 11–14)
 Jack Lawrence – bass (2–4, 6–8, 11, 13, 14) marimba (4), backing vocals (11)
 Brian Chase – drums (2, 3, 5–7, 9, 11, 12, 14), percussion (8) backing vocals (11)
 Imaad Wasif – guitar (1, 2, 6–9, 11, 12, 14) backing vocals (11) harmonica (13)
 Greg Kurstin – piano (4, 6, 11 )
 Mark Chalecki – mastering (1–9, 11–14)
 Nick Zinner – electric guitar (2), guitar (6, 12, 14)
 Oscar Michel – bowed bass (8)
 Max Records – co-lead vocals (2)
 Aaron Hemphill – drums (3)
 Tristan Bechet – drum programming (5), guitar (12)
 Carter Burwell – orchestrater (10), conductor (10)
 Mark Stewart, Marc Ribot – guitar (10)
 Barbara Allen, Victoria Drake – harp (10)
 David Weiß – woodwind (10)
 Sharon Yamada, Laura Seaton – violin (10)
 Robert Reinhart – viola  (10)
 David Cossin, Gordon Gottlieb – percussion (10)
 Rob Botti – oboe (10)
 Michael Farrow – mixing (10)
 Tony Finno – copyist (10)
 Sandra Park – strings contractor (10)
 Pavel Vinnitsky – clarinet (10)
 Eileen Moon – cello (10)
 Marc Goldberg – bassoon (10)
 Greg Cohen – bass (10)

Charts

References 

2009 soundtrack albums
DGC Records albums
Fantasy film soundtracks
Interscope Records soundtracks
Karen O albums